This is a list of South American countries by population based on the country population estimates published by the UN.

See also 

 List of South American countries by area
 List of South American countries by life expectancy

References

Lists of countries by continent
 
Demographics of South America
South America
South America
South America
Countries by population 2015
South America